Danilo Barozzi (21 August 1927 – 25 March 2020) was an Italian cyclist.

Biography
Barozzi was a professional cyclist from 1949 to 1958. He won a stage of the Volta a Catalunya in 1950 and the Gran Premio Industria e Commercio di Prato in 1954 and 1956. He died of COVID-19 in 2020.

Career achievements

Major results

1948
 1st Coppa Caivano
1949
 2nd Giro di Toscana
 3rd Coppa Placci
 5th Overall Tour de Suisse
1950
 1st Stage 6 Volta a Catalunya
 3rd Giro dell'Emilia
1951
 3rd Giro del Veneto
 9th Milan–San Remo
1952
 2nd Giro del Veneto
 2nd Coppa Bernocchi
 3rd GP Alghero
 4th Giro di Romagna
 4th Giro di Lombardia
 5th Tre Valli Varesine
1953
 2nd Trofeo Matteotti
 2nd Coppa Placci
 3rd Giro di Romagna
 3rd Overall Tour de Suisse
1954
 1st Gran Premio Industria e Commercio di Prato
1955
 2nd Trofeo Matteotti
 8th Giro di Lombardia
1956
 1st Gran Premio Industria e Commercio di Prato

Grand Tour Results

Tour de France 
1958: 38th

Giro d'Italia
1949: DNF
1950: DNF
1951: 32nd
1952: 40th
1953: 19th
1954: 18th
1955: 38th
1956: 24th
1957: DNF

References

1927 births
2020 deaths
Italian male cyclists
Deaths from the COVID-19 pandemic in Emilia-Romagna
Sportspeople from the Province of Reggio Emilia
Cyclists from Emilia-Romagna